The Disability Foundation (TDF) is a United Kingdom based non-profit organization.

Its aim is to promote the lives of disabled people and anyone suffering from a chronic health issue or medical condition, and their families/those involved in their care by offering complementary therapy treatments at its clinic based in the grounds of the Royal National Orthopedic Hospital (RNOH) in Stanmore (HA7 4LP). Treatments on offer include: Remedial and Therapeutic Massage, Aromatherapy, Acupunture, Reflexology, Chiropody, Counselling, Osteopahty, Reiki and Craniosacral Therapy.

TDF also provides information about conventional and complementary treatments and therapies.

The foundation was founded in 1998 by the British actress Julie Fernandez. TDF began as a limited company and registered charity (1998) and gained charitable status in 1999. All of its therapists are fully qualified and undergo DBS checks.

External links
 The Disability Foundation

Disability organisations based in the United Kingdom